Rhamphomyia sudigeronis is a species of dance flies (insects in the family Empididae).

References

Rhamphomyia
Articles created by Qbugbot
Insects described in 1895